Timothy John Murphy (22 July 1878 – 1 January 1902) was an  Australian rules footballer who played with St Kilda in the Victorian Football League (VFL).

He was appointed as a police constable in April 1901 and played one game for St Kilda before being posted to Mildura. Later that year he contracted typhoid fever and he died in Mildura on New Year's Day in 1902.

References

External links 

1878 births
1902 deaths
Australian rules footballers from Victoria (Australia)
St Kilda Football Club players